The 1975 NAIA Division II football season was the 20th season of college football sponsored by the NAIA and the sixth season of play of the NAIA's lower division for football.

The season was played from August to November 1975 and culminated in the 1975 NAIA Division II Football National Championship, played on the campus of California Lutheran University in Thousand Oaks, California.

Texas Lutheran defeated Cal Lutheran in the championship game, 34–8, to win their second consecutive NAIA national title.

Conference standings

Postseason

See also
 1975 NAIA Division I football season
 1975 NCAA Division I football season
 1975 NCAA Division II football season
 1975 NCAA Division III football season

References

 
NAIA Football National Championship